BAE Systems Electronic Systems (ES) is one of three operating groups of BAE Systems Inc., the North American subsidiary of the British global defence contractor BAE Systems PLC.

History
BAE Systems acquired Lockheed Martin Aerospace Electronic Systems (AES) and Lockheed Martin Control Systems in 2000.

BAE Systems Electronic Systems was formed in June 2005 by an internal reorganisation of these businesses.

Lockheed had identified AES as a candidate for disposal following a strategic review in 1999. BAE Systems agreed to acquire the group in July and completed its acquisition of AES on 27 November 2000. The group encompassed Sanders Associates, Fairchild Systems and Lockheed Martin Space Electronics & Communications. The purchase of this group by BAE has been described as "precedent setting" given the advanced and classified nature of many of that company's products.

In August 2004 BAE acquired Boeing Commercial Electronics for $66 million (£36m). This was an Irving, Texas-based division of Boeing responsible for the manufacture of electronic components for the company's aircraft. Boeing announced the sale of the division in 2003 as part of a move to outsource component manufacture and "concentrate on the integration and final assembly of commercial aircraft." The Fort Worth Star Telegram said "Boeing has sought to sell several operations that it said are too narrowly focused and costly for the company to manage efficiently."

Businesses
BAE Systems Electronic Systems reports its sales under the following headings, 86% of which were to military customers in 2020:

Electronic Combat 
ES produces electronic warfare (EW) systems for combat aircraft, for example for the F-35 Lightning II.

C4ISR Systems 
Military communications.  This includes the Airborne Tactical Radio business acquired from Raytheon.

Precision Strike & Sensing 
GPS products and weapon parts, for example seekers for THAAD missiles.  The GPS business was expanded in 2020 by the $1.9 billion purchase of the Collins Aerospace military GPS division of United Technologies Corporation.

Countermeasure & Electromagnetic Attack 
Missile warning systems and offensive electronic warfare systems on aircraft including the Lockheed EC-130H Compass Call.

Controls & Avionics 
Full Authority Digital Engine Controls and Fly by wire controls.  General Electric and Boeing are major customers for this unit.

Power & Propulsion 
Hybrid and full electric drive systems for public transit, marine/port, and military applications.

References

Electronics, Intelligence & Support
Avionics companies
Defense companies of the United States
Companies based in Arlington County, Virginia
American companies established in 2005
Manufacturing companies established in 2005
Technology companies established in 2005
2005 establishments in Virginia